Midwest Christian College was a private, Christian college established in 1946 in Oklahoma City.  During its first year, it enrolled thirty-three students. After peaking in the 1970s and '80s, it experienced a period of declining enrollment and financial difficulty.  It merged in 1985 with Ozark Bible College of Joplin, Missouri to form Ozark Christian College.

References

External links
Midwest Christian College Alumni Association
Ozark Christian College

Private universities and colleges in Oklahoma
Universities and colleges affiliated with the Christian churches and churches of Christ
Bible colleges
Universities and colleges in Oklahoma City
Educational institutions established in 1946
1946 establishments in Oklahoma